Charles Hial Darling (May 9, 1859 – October 31, 1944) was United States Assistant Secretary of the Navy from 1901 to 1905.

Biography
Darling was born in Woodstock, Vermont on May 9, 1859.  He was educated at Green Mountain Perkins Academy and Montpelier Seminary, and went to college at Tufts, receiving his A.B. in 1884.  He was admitted to the bar in 1886, and practiced in Bennington, Vermont as the partner of Orion M. Barber.  A Republican, he was appointed as a municipal judge in 1887 by Governor of Vermont Ebenezer J. Ormsbee, and subsequently reappointed by each governor until 1901.  In 1889, he married Agnes C. Norton of Bennington, and together the couple had three daughters, Margaret, Alice, and Elizabeth.

Darling was elected president of the village of Bennington in 1895, and in 1896-97, he represented the town of Bennington in the Vermont House of Representatives.  He was elected president of the Vermont Bar Association in 1900.

In 1901, President of the United States Theodore Roosevelt nominated Darling as Assistant Secretary of the Navy.  Darling held this office from December 17, 1901 until October 30, 1905.

Upon leaving Washington, D. C. in 1906, Darling settled in Burlington, Vermont.

Darling was active with the Sons of the American Revolution, serving as  the Vermont society's president in 1908, and with the Vermont Historical Society, of which he was a life member.  He was also an active Freemason.

References

Sources
 Prentiss Cutler Dodge, Encyclopedia - Vermont Biography (Burlington Ullery Publishing Co., 1912): p. 163
 Walter Hill Crockett, Vermont: The Green Mount State (New York: Century History Co., 1921), p. 353
 Walter John Coates (ed.), A Bibliography of Vermont Poetry and Gazetteer of Vermont Poets (Montpelier: Vermont Historical Society, 1942)] [Vol. 1], p. 102.

1859 births
1944 deaths
Sons of the American Revolution
United States Assistant Secretaries of the Navy
People from Woodstock, Vermont
Vermont lawyers
Members of the Vermont House of Representatives